The 13th Hong Kong Awards ceremony, honored the best films of 1993 and took place on 22 April 1994 at Hong Kong Academy for Performing Arts, Wan Chai, Hong Kong. The ceremony was hosted by Lydia Shum and John Sham, during the ceremony awards are presented in 17 categories.

Awards
Winners are listed first, highlighted in boldface, and indicated with a double dagger.

References

External links
Official website of the Hong Kong Film Awards

1994
1993 film awards
1994 in Hong Kong